South Middle Street Historic District is a national historic district located at Cape Girardeau, Cape Girardeau County, Missouri.  The district encompasses 15 contributing buildings in an exclusively residential section of Cape Girardeau.  It developed between about 1890 and 1931, and includes representative examples of Late Victorian and Bungalow / American Craftsman style architecture.  The houses were constructed for working and middle class residents.

It was listed on the National Register of Historic Places in 2009.

References

Historic districts on the National Register of Historic Places in Missouri
Houses on the National Register of Historic Places in Missouri
Victorian architecture in Missouri
Bungalow architecture in Missouri
Historic districts in Cape Girardeau County, Missouri
National Register of Historic Places in Cape Girardeau County, Missouri